Giambalvo is an Italian surname. 

The name derives from Southern Italian variants on the names Gianni and Balbo.

Notable people with the surname
Carol Giambalvo, American anti-cult exit counselor
Louis Giambalvo (born 1945), American character actor
Valerio Giambalvo (born 1968), Italian swimmer

References

Surnames of Italian origin